The Midland Empire Conference (also called MEC) is a high school athletic conference whose members are located in northwest Missouri. The conference participates in the MSHSAA.

The conference was created during a March 1962 meeting at Armstrong's Restaurant in Maryville, Missouri and took effect in the 1962-63 school year.  The original five schools were four schools from St. Joseph, Missouri (Benton, Christian Brothers (which would fold into LeBlond), and Lafayette) and two other schools from northwest Missouri (Maryville and Savannah).  The arrangement created a league of schools of comparable size (the St. Joseph schools earlier competed in the Pony Express Conference which included the much larger St. Joseph Central High School as well as larger suburban Kansas City schools while Savannah and Maryville since 1937 competed in the Northwest Missouri Conference with much smaller schools.

Discussions of creating a conference of larger comparable sized schools in northwest Missouri had been discussed since at least 1925 but never quite materialized.

In 2018, Smithville left the conference for the Suburban Kansas City Conference and was replaced by St. Pius X in Kansas City.

Member schools

Former members
Smithville High School (1998-2018)
Platte County High School (1998-2007)

References

 
High school sports conferences and leagues in the United States
Missouri high school athletic conferences